Glyptocephalus is a genus of righteye flounders found in the North Atlantic and North Pacific Oceans

Etymology

The word Glytocephalus is derived from the Greek γλύφειν (glyphein), meaning "to carve", and κεφαλή (kephalē), meaning "head".

Species
There are currently three recognized species in this genus:

References 

 
Pleuronectidae
Marine fish genera
Taxa named by Carl Moritz Gottsche